The Royal Malaysian Air Force (RMAF, ;) was formed on 2 June 1958 as the Royal Federation of Malaya Air Force. However, its roots can be traced back to the Malayan Auxiliary Air Force formations of the British Royal Air Force in then-colonial British Malaya. The Royal Malaysian Air Force operates a mix of modern American, European and Russian-made aircraft.

History

Early years

The Malaysian air forces trace their lineage to the Malayan Auxiliary Air Force formations of the Royal Air Force (RAF) formed in 1934.  They later transformed into the Straits Settlements Volunteer Air Force (SSVAF) and the Malayan Volunteers Air Force (MVAF) formed in 1940 and dissolved in 1942 during the height of the Japanese advance over Malaya.  The latter was re-established in 1950 in time for the Malayan Emergency and contributed very much to the war effort.

On 2 June 1958 the MVAF finally became the Royal Federation of Malaya Air Force (RFMAF), this date is celebrated as RMAF Day yearly, the Royal title granted by Parliament in honor of its contributions to national defence during the Emergency and the transition to independent status.

On 25 October 1962, after the end of the Malayan Emergency, the RAF handed over their first airfields in Malaya to the RFMAF, at Simpang Airport; it was opened on 1 June 1941, in Sungai Besi, Kuala Lumpur which was formerly part of Selangor and the national capital city.  The first aircraft for the fledgling air force was a Scottish Aviation Twin Pioneer named "" by the then Prime Minister Tunku Abdul Rahman.  Several Malayans serving with the Royal Air Force transferred to the Royal Federation of Malaya Air Force.  The role played by RMAF was limited initially to communications and the support of ground operations against Communist insurgents during the Malayan Emergency. RMAF received its first combat aircraft with the delivery of 20 Canadair CL41G Tebuans (an armed version of the Canadair Tutor trainer). RMAF also received Aérospatiale Alouette III helicopters, to be used in the liaison role.

With the formation of Malaysia on 16 September 1963, the name of the air force was changed to "Tentera Udara Diraja Malaysia" or "Royal Malaysian Air Force".  New types introduced into service included the Handley Page Herald transport and the De Havilland Canada DHC-4 Caribou. RMAF received Sikorsky S-61A-4 helicopters in the late 1960s and early 1970s which were used in the transport role. 
RMAF gained an air defence capability when the Australian Government donated 10 ex-Royal Australian Air Force (RAAF) CAC Sabre fighters. These were based at the Butterworth Air Base. After the withdrawal of British military forces from Malaysia and Singapore at the end of 1971, a Five Power Defence Arrangements (FPDA) agreement between Malaysia, Singapore, New Zealand, Australia, and the United Kingdom was concluded to ensure defence against external aggression. The RAAF maintained two Mirage IIIO squadrons at RAF/RAAF Station Butterworth, Butterworth Air Base as part of its commitment to the FPDA.  These squadrons were withdrawn in 1986, although occasional deployments of RAAF aircraft continue.

Modernisation

With the withdrawal of British military forces, RMAF underwent gradual modernisation from the 1970s to the 1990s. The Sabre were replaced by 16 Northrop F-5E Tiger-IIs.  A reconnaissance capability was acquired with the purchase of two RF-5E Tigereye aircraft. RMAF also purchased 88 ex-US Navy Douglas A-4C Skyhawks, of which 40 of the airframes were converted/refurbished by Grumman Aircraft Engineering at Bethpage into the A-4PTM ('Peculiar To Malaysia'), configuration (similar to A-4M standard). RMAF has traditionally looked to the West for its purchases, primarily to the United States.  However, limitations imposed by the US on "new technology" to the region, such as the AIM-120 AMRAAM fire-and-forget air-to-air missile, has made RMAF consider purchases from Russia and other non-traditional sources.  The 1990s saw the arrival of first the BAE Hawk Mk108/208 which replaced the T/A-4PTMs, followed by the MiG-29N/NUB in 1995 in the air superiority role and delivery of the F/A-18D Hornet in 1997 to provide an all weather interdiction capability. In 2003 a contract was signed for 18 Su-30MKMs for delivery in 2007 to fulfill a requirement for an initial order of multi-role combat aircraft (MRCA). A requirement for a further 18 MRCAs remains unfulfilled.  RMAF is also looking for an AWACS aircraft, although no firm orders have been placed.

On 8 December 2005, four Airbus Military A400M aircraft were ordered to enhance the airlift capability. By March 2017 all Malaysian A400Ms were delivered to the customer. In late 2006, the Government signed a contract to purchase eight Aermacchi MB-339CMs to add to the eight MB-339AMs already in service.

In March 2007, then-Deputy Prime Minister and Defence Minister Najib Razak notified the public that the MiG-29 would continue in service until 2010. Later that year, Najib announced the Sikorsky S-61A4 Nuri helicopter, in service since 1968 with 89 crew members killed in 15 accidents, would be phased out by 2012 and replaced by the Eurocopter EC725. Deputy RMAF Chief Lieutenant General Bashir Abu Bakar told the media after opening Heli-Asia 2007, that tender assessment for the replacement of the Sikorsky S-61A-4 Nuri would occur in early 2008. At the 12th Defence Services Asia (DSA) exhibition 2010, a Letter of Agreement (LOA) was signed for 12 EC725 helicopters to be supplied to the RMAF.

The RMAF currently has a MRCA replacement program to replace the MiG-29 and F-5 fighters that will be retired by the end of 2015. The MRCA replacement program is currently narrowed down to four types of aircraft (Eurofighter Typhoon, Dassault Rafale, F/A-18E/F Super Hornet and Saab JAS 39 Gripen). Under the program, the RMAF is looking to equip three squadrons with 36 to 40 new fighter aircraft with a budget of RM6 billion to RM8 billion (US$1.84 billion to US$2.46 billion).

RMAF also has a Maritime Patrol Aircraft (MPA) program in pipe line. In December 2017, the RMAF's Brigadier General Yazid Bin Arshad announced it had shortlisted four aircraft types to replace the force's ageing fleet of Beechcraft Super King Air maritime patrol aircraft. The selected types are the EADS CASA C-295 from Airbus, the P-8 Poseidon from Boeing, ATR 72 MP from ATR, a joint venture between Airbus and Leonardo, and the CASA/IPTN CN-235, which could be provided by either Airbus or Indonesian Aerospace, which acquired a licence to produce it.

It was reported on 7 January 2020 that the RMAF grounded its Sikorsky S61A-4 Nuri helicopters and RMAF General Ackbal Abdul Samad remarked that there was an evaluation of a new utility helicopter to replace the Sikorsky S61A-4 Nuri.

Chiefs of the Royal Malaysian Air Force

Ranks

Until the late 1970s, the Royal Malaysian Air Force used the same officer ranking system as the Royal Air Force. They were replaced by army-style designations and given Malay title equivalents, but the sleeve insignia remained the same mirroring the RAF practice, but all General Officers wear 1 to 5 stars on the shoulder board in addition to the existing sleeve insignia. The list of ranks which are currently used are shown below (in descending order).
NCOs and enlisted ranks remained unchanged, and retain their pre-1970s names.

All officers, with the exception of the Marshal of the Royal Malaysian Air Force apply the Air Force acronym (RMAF, TUDM) to their rank title, to differentiate from their Malaysian Army equivalents. For example, a Colonel in the Air Force would be titled Colonel, RMAF or Kolonel, TUDM  in Malay.

Royal Malaysian Air Force regiment

The RMAF Regiment is the ground and air defence support unit of the RMAF. The regiment is composed of five sub-units tasked with fulfilling the RMAF's mission.
These units are:

PASKAU

PASKAU was formed in response to a mortar attack by the then Communist Party of Malaya on a DHC-4 Caribou in the 1970s at the Kuala Lumpur Air Base. During peacetime, the unit is tasked with responding to aircraft hijacking incidents as well as protecting the country's numerous RMAF airbases and civilian airports. Its wartime roles include ground designation, sabotaging of enemy air assets and equipment and the defence of RMAF aircraft and bases. This unit is also deployed for counter-terrorism duties as well as Urban warfare/Close quarters combat.

HANDAU

HANDAU is the former name given to RMAF special forces PASKAU. HANDAU is presently tasked with on-base security as security troopers. They can be called to any special tasks (notably counter terrorism) along with any armed incidents which may occur on base and can be called to assist RMAF provost officers in handling armed incidents. Their roles are not to be confused with the now PASKAU and the RMAF Provost Unit (which is tasked with upholding military law on base) as they primarily serve as on-ground security combat forces (modelled after the US Air Force Security Forces). HANDAU and PASKAU are now separated into two different units with one serving as a special force of the RMAF and the other as on base security troopers and a ground security combat force. They can be recognised by their standard RMAF berets with the HANDAU cap badge and their vests with the text "HANDAU".

RMAF Provost Unit
This is the military police unit of the RMAF regiment, mandated to provide military police duties in RMAF airbases.

RMAF Infantry
The unit that is equipped with firearms for combat duties. They are tasked as a support element for airforce special forces and are heliborne trained. 

RMAF Ground Air Defence Artillery
This regiment responsible for providing air defense protection by using Ground Base Air Defence (GBAD) to the important places such as airbases as well as RMAF asset.

Aerobatic team

The Kris Sakti is the aerobatic display team of the Royal Malaysian Air Force. It made its debut on 2011 Langkawi International Maritime and Air Show in December 2011. They operated four Extra 300L aircraft.

Squadrons

Airfields/Airbases
List:
 TUDM Butterworth, Penang (RMAF Butterworth), (Base of F/A-18 Hornets)
 TUDM Kuantan, Pahang (RMAF Kuantan)
 TUDM Gong Kedak, Kelantan (RMAF Gong Kedak) (Base of Su-30MKMs)
 TUDM Labuan, Sabah (RMAF Labuan) (Base of BAE Hawks)
 TUDM Kuala Lumpur (RMAF Kuala Lumpur)
 TUDM Subang, Selangor (RMAF Subang)
 TUDM Kuching, Sarawak (RMAF Kuching)
 TUDM Alor Setar, Kedah (RMAF Alor Setar) (Air Force Academy)
 TUDM Ipoh, Perak (RMAF Ipoh) (Air Force School)
 TUDM Bukit Lunchu, Johor (RMAF Bukit Lunchu) (Control and Reporting Post)
 TUDM Kinrara, Selangor (RMAF Kinrara) (School of Logistic Management; also houses a central hospital facility)
 TUDM Jugra, Selangor (RMAF Jugra) (PASKAU headquarters)
 TUDM Bukit Ibam, Pahang (RMAF Bukit Ibam)
 TUDM Sendayan, Negeri Sembilan (RMAF Sendayan)

Incidents and accidents
 Since 1989, around 95 armed forces personnel (most of those are the RMAF) have been killed in 18 crashes involving the ageing type American-made Sikorsky S-61A4 Nuri helicopter. This led the RMAF to purchase the French-made EC725 helicopter to replace it. But with the nation having ordered only 12 of a planned 28 EC725 helicopters as replacements, the RMAF was forced to prolong the life of its Sikorskys. On October 21 2016, it was reported that a Canadian helicopter company Heli-One will upgrade all Malaysia's Nuri helicopter.
 On November 9 2004, a Mikoyan MiG-29 crashed into an oil palm plantation in Kemaman, Terengganu. The pilot survived the crash.
 In May 2008, two J85-GE-21 engines that power the Northrop F-5E Tiger II fighter jets belonging to the Royal Malaysian Air Force were reported missing, as of sometime in 2007, from an RMAF warehouse in Kuala Lumpur during Najib's tenure as Defence Minister in Abdullah Ahmad Badawi's cabinet. The jet engines belonged to the 12th Squadron (Scorpion) based in Butterworth. The issue became a matter of political dispute, and it was reported a brigadier-general together with 40 other armed forces personnel had been sacked over the incident. Further investigation led to the arrest of two RMAF personnel and a civilian contractor were charged in connection with the theft and disposal of both engines on 6 January 2010. On February 5 2010, Attorney-General Abdul Gani Patail revealed that the two missing engines had been found in Uruguay with the help of the Government of Uruguay and the Malaysian government is proceeding with the necessary measures to secure their return. Investigations showed that the engines were taken out of the RMAF base between 20 December 2007 to 1 January 2008 before being sent to a warehouse in Subang Jaya to be shipped out of Malaysia to South America.
 On February 26 2016, the Indonesian made-CN-235-220M version were forced to make an emergency landing into a mangrove swamp near Kuala Selangor due to engine failure. The co-pilot sustained a broken left arm during the incident while the rest of the crew managed to escape without any major injuries. A fisherman who were trying to help the crews out of the aircraft were reported drowned after his foot got stuck in the mud. The black box from the aircraft was eventually found on the next day and was sent to Bandung, Indonesia for it to be analyzed by the Indonesian manufacturer over the cause of the accident.
 On May 17 2016, an Italian made Aermacchi MB-339 crashed into a paddy field near Nenasi, Pahang during its training mission from Kuantan Airbase. Both crew members managed to eject from the aircraft with one suffered from a broken leg during the eject.
 On December 21 2016, an American-made Beechcraft King Air 200T crashed into Butterworth airbase during its training mission from Subang airbase, killing one pilot, leaving the other three injured.
 On June 14 2017, two pilots were killed after a British-made BAE Hawk (Mk 108) crashed at the Pahang - Terengganu border. Previously, several other Hawks had crashed during training missions.
 On November 16 2021, at around 10:07pm, a British-made BAE Hawk (Mk 108) crashed on the runway of Butterworth Airbase, killing one of the pilot while the other survived.

Equipment

Present development

RMAF has traditionally looked to the West for its purchases, primarily to the United States and Europe. However, RMAF also considers purchases from Russia and other non-traditional sources for its modernisation program.

Multi-role combat aircraft
As a part of the Malaysia's Multi-Role Combat Aircraft (MRCA) program, Malaysia is looking to replace its aging MiG-29 and F-5 fighters with possibly the F/A-18 Super Hornet, Dassault Rafale, Eurofighter, JAS 39 Gripen, Sukhoi Su-30/35 or the Mikoyan MiG-35. Dassault Rafale has offered a financial package with a ten-year repayment loan from a French commercial bank and guaranteed by the government of France to assist procurement of their fighter. This offer was countered by BAE Systems' Eurofighter Typhoon and Saab JAS 39 Gripen, which have offered competitive leasing deals instead. EADS and BAE Systems has each offered to set up joint venture companies for maintenance and repair of its aircraft if it is selected, along with competitive financial support extended by the United Kingdom government.

Russia is ready to offer their jet fighters to meet Malaysia's requirements. The Russian defence export corporation, Rosoboronexport, which supplied the Royal Malaysian Air Force with the Sukhoi Su-30MKM, expressed its readiness to discuss the prospect of establishing joint licensed production facilities in Malaysia. The Russians have argued that despite some initial advantages, especially in terms of meeting the high cost for maintenance, fuel, parts and insurance in the short term, the lessors of the aircraft will require frequent checks to be assured that the terms of the lease are upheld, and the aircraft will eventually have to be returned after the lease period is up. As such, leasing a fighter aircraft will have significant drawbacks in the defence of the sovereignty of the nation. Instead, the Russian are offering their Sukhoi Su-35 at lower prices than their western rivals. However, according to the Malaysian Ministry of Defence, the race for new fighter jets has narrowed down to the Rafale and the Eurofighter Typhoon instead.

Following a visit by the French President also in early 2017, Malaysia said they remained undecided whether to buy the French fighter, although it had become the leader on the list of all jet fighters suggested, with Malaysian Prime Minister Najib Razak assuring the French President that they were considering to buy. The French government confirmed that negotiation was on the way, although no final deal has yet been signed.

Due to the delay in the MRCA program and also an increase of China's aggression in the South China Sea dispute, it was believed that there was an immediate requirement for new fighters. Following the visit of the Saudi King in early 2017, Malaysia was reportedly seeking to buy excess Royal Saudi Air Force or other Arab nation's jet fighters and helicopters.

Light combat aircraft
In 2019, Malaysia formally launched its Light Combat Aircraft (LCA) program. The major contenders of this project were the KAI T-50 Golden Eagle, Alenia Aermacchi M-346 Master, HAL Tejas, Yakovlev Yak-130,L-15 Falcon, Boeing T-7 Red Hawk and Aero L-39NG. Malaysia intended to use this LCA to augment the existing fleet of its multi-role combat aircraft and also as a fighter lead-in trainer. At the end of 2020, LCA program was approved by the government and the procurement of the aircraft would start in 2021. In 2021, Russian defence export agency, Rosoboronexport, said Russia would send Mikoyan MiG-35 as a contender of the LCA program. 
India has responded with HAL Tejas manufactured by Hindustan Aeronautics Limited as a contender which is a full fledged active fighter jet under mass production. It has world class avionics and refined design and sophisticated armaments including Brahmos. Turkey has also sent their TAI Hürjet as a contender of the LCA program.

In February 2023, Ministry of Defence has chosen  FA-50 Block 20 from South Korea for the new RMAF's LCA/FLIT.

Maritime patrol aircraft
Malaysia also urgently needs to boost its maritime patrol capability with a new maritime patrol aircraft. In response to this need, Malaysia has launched its Maritime Patrol Aircraft (MPA) program. At first, Malaysia was reportedly considering an offer from Japan for the used P-3C Orion but this intention was cancelled due to high cost for refurbishment and maintenance the used aircraft. In December 2017, the Royal Malaysian Air Force's Brigadier General Yazid Bin Arshad announced that it had shortlisted four aircraft to replace the force's ageing fleet of Beechcraft Super King Air. The candidates were the EADS CASA C-295 from Airbus, the P-8 Poseidon from Boeing, ATR 72 MP from ATR, a joint venture between Airbus and Leonardo, and the CASA/IPTN CN-235, which could be provided by either Airbus or Indonesian Aerospace, which acquired a licence to produce it. The new MPA procurement would start in 2021 after the government gives approval for the Royal Malaysian Air Force for the acquisition of such aircraft in the budget hearing at the end of 2020. In 2021, the RMAF has confirmed that it will procure six new maritime patrol aircraft to replace its Beechcraft Super King Air. In addition, Malaysia also launched its second MPA program which was the conversion of the existing fleet of CASA/IPTN CN-235 transport aircraft to the maritime patrol role. This program started at the end of 2020 and is intended as an interim solution while waiting for a newly ordered aircraft to be commissioned.

As of March 2022, the procurement process of the MPA is still at the Ministry of Finance level, and there are several candidates (aircraft companies) who have been shortlisted for further action.

In October 2022, the Malaysian government has finalised a tender to procure two maritime patrol aircraft (MPA) for the country's air force and will soon award a contract for this programme to Leonardo. Malaysia's defense minister, Hishammuddin Hussein made no mention of the aircraft types in his announcement but Leonardo has proposed its ATR 72MP twin-turboprop aircraft for Malaysia's requirements.

Airborne early warning and control aircraft
Malaysia has also planned to acquire airborne early warning and control aircraft. Saab is pitching their airborne early warning and control aircraft, the Global Eye, which is the Bombardier 6000 equipped with Erieye radar system and is looking for local partners in Malaysia for manufacturing and maintenance, repair and overhaul.

Medium-altitude long-endurance unmanned aerial vehicle
As a part of the modernization program, Malaysia also intends to acquire six MALE UAV. Malaysian government has issues a MALE UAV tender in 2020 and it is expected the procurement will take place in 2021. The major contenders of this project would be the General Atomics MQ-9 Reaper, TAI Anka, Bayraktar TB2, Safran Patroller, Thales Watchkeeper WK450, Kronshtadt Orion, CAIG Wing Loong and CASC Rainbow.

As of March 2022, it is reported the program is currently undergoing physical evaluation stage which has been shortlisted by the Procurement Board of the Ministry of Defence, and this process is still ongoing.

In October 2022, Malaysia's Defence Minister, Hishammudin Hussein announced that the Turkish Aerospace Industries is selected for the procurement of three MALE-UAS units.

Utility helicopter
In 2007, Najib Razak announced that the Sikorsky S-61A4 Nuri helicopter in service since 1968 would be phased out by 2012 and replaced by the Eurocopter EC725. Deputy RMAF Chief Lieutenant General Bashir Abu Bakar told the media after opening Heli-Asia 2007 that tender assessment for the replacement of the Sikorsky S-61A-4 Nuri would occur in early 2008. At the 12th Defence Services Asia (DSA) exhibition 2010, a Letter of Agreement (LOA) was signed for 12 EC725 helicopters to be supplied to the RMAF. With that, EADS, (the European Aeronautical Defence and Space Company), pledged 100 million Euros to set up a comprehensive helicopter centre in Subang for an aeronautical academy, training, simulation and a maintenance, repair and overhaul facility for the Eurocopter EC725 military version and the Eurocopter EC225 civilian model.

Although there was a plan to replace all the Sikorsky S-61A-4 Nuri, due to budget constraints the government only managed to buy 12 Eurocopter EC725. For this reason, Nuri helicopters were still active in service until 2019. In LIMA 2019, Malaysia also expressed interest to buy Mil Mi-171 ( modified armed version for Mil Mi-17) from Russia. It was reported on 7 January 2020 that the RMAF grounded its Nuri helicopters and RMAF General Ackbal Abdul Samad remarked that there was an evaluation of a new utility helicopter to replace all the remaining Nuri.

In 2021, 4 AgustaWestland AW139 were leased from a Malaysian aviation company, Weststar Aviation, as temporary replacement before the eventual procurement of new 24 helicopters to replace the S-61A4 Nuri.

Ground-based radar
In 2019, it is confirmed that RMAF sought for three new ground-based radar. The major contenders of this project would be the Thales Ground Master 400, Selex RAT-31, Giraffe radar and Lockheed Martin TPS-77 MMR.

In 2021, it is reported the US Department of Defense has 'gifted' an export version of Lockheed Martin TPS-77 MMR to Malaysia in order to provide secure interoperable C3I (Command Control Communications and Intelligence) and Sensor systems supporting U.S. Joint Air Operations to US Government FMS (Foreign Military Sales) customers.

Medium-range air defence
In 2021, it was confirmed that RMAF sought for a regiment of medium-range air defence system to improve the national air defence capabilities. The contenders for the program are still unknown.

In 2014, a Malaysian private company signed a memorandum of understanding with a Chinese defence firm to acquire Chinese LY-80 medium range air defence missile, but the government of Malaysia did not endorse it.

See also

Malaysian Armed Forces
Malaysian Army
Royal Malaysian Navy
 Malaysia Coast Guard
Royal Malaysia Police
Royal Johor Military Force
Joint Forces Command

References

External links

 RMAF Official Website
 Malaysian Armed Forces Official Website
 Malaysian Ministry of Defence Official Website
 Scramble, Malaysian Forces Overview, Tentera Udara Diraja Malaysia (TUDM)
 Royal Malaysian Air Force Museum
 Bases and Squadrons

 
Malaysian Air Force
Aircraft of the Royal Malaysian Air Force
Military units and formations established in 1958
1958 establishments in Malaya
Ministry of Defence (Malaysia)